Agârbiciu may refer to several places in Romania:

 Agârbiciu, a village in Căpușu Mare Commune, Cluj County
 Agârbiciu, a village in Axente Sever Commune, Sibiu County
 Agârbiciu (river), a tributary of the Someșul Cald in Cluj County